Palangabad-e Olya (also Romanized as Palangābād-e ‘Olyā; also known as Palangābād-e Bālā) is a village in Tameshkol Rural District, Nashta District, Tonekabon County, Mazandaran Province, Iran. At the 2006 census, its population was 317, in 87 families.

References 

Populated places in Tonekabon County